Sir Lindsay Parkinson & Company Ltd, commonly known as Sir Lindsay Parkinson & Co. Ltd or Lindsay Parkinson was a civil engineering company in the UK. It was acquired by Leonard Fairclough & Son in 1974, which later (1982) merged into AMEC, and then became part of Wood Group.

History

The original name of the firm, registered about 1877, was Jacob Parkinson and Company, and Jacob operated a joiner's shop in Blackpool.  His four sons worked in the business, one of whom was the eponymous Lindsay Parkinson. Joinery developed into general building work and in the early 1900s Parkinson's contracts included the Talbot Hotel and the Alhambra Theatre in Blackpool. A contract to work on the Theatre Royal in Newcastle upon Tyne led to the opening of an office in that city; a number of theatres were built in other towns in the north and the midlands. By the time of World War I, the company had a London office.

The war expanded the range of contracts to include aerodromes and railway sidings. When peace came, the firm became involved in large-scale housing schemes (including the Parkinson-Kahn reinforced concrete house) and a wider range of civil engineering work – including new trunk roads. Lindsay Parkinson was knighted for public services and the company took on his new name.

Public company
On 13 July 1937, it was incorporated as a public company, technically known as Sir Lindsay Parkinson Holdings Limited. The shares were issued by Robert Benson & Co. Ltd (later Kleinwort Benson from 1961), based on 22 Old Broad Street.

The Directors of the company were Lt-Col George Westhead Parkinson MC (the chairman), Albert Edward Parkinson (managing director), Edward Parkinson, and Captain Constantine Evelyn Benson DSO.

It was first based at the now demolished Lindsay House, 171, Shaftesbury Avenue (moving to the company-built offices at 6, Lambeth Road, at the bottom of Waterloo Road (St. George's Circus) in 1955) on the site of a defunct nunnery. There was also an office at Talbot Saw Mills in Blackpool.

In May 1939, the company lent £200,000 to the British government, on an interest-free loan. During the Second World War the company was one of the contractors engaged in building the Mulberry Harbour units.

On 20 December 1943, the Chairman of the company, Lt-Col G.W.Parkinson, was killed, after his car hit a lorry at Bedfont on the Great South-West Road. He was aged 69. The managing director since 1937, A.E.Parkinson, became chairman.

In the mid-1950s, amongst other projects, it had extensive building contracts in Cyprus and was extensively expanding the North Thames Gas Board's Beckton Gasworks in East London.

The Parkinson Strip Mining Company opened at Ewart Hill.

Contracts

On 5 July 1957, it began building its first motorway, the Lancaster bypass. The contract included 27 bridges. It was hampered by bad weather in 1958, but the summer of 1959 had good weather. It was opened on Monday 11 April 1960 by Charles Hill, Baron Hill of Luton and cost £4 million. In December 1960, it was given a £2.2 million contract for the preparation of Oldbury Nuclear Power Station. In June 1961, it was given the £5.9 million contract for nine miles of the M6 (Birmingham – Preston Motorway) in Cheshire, north of the Staffordshire boundary. In February 1963, it was given a contract for preparations for Kingsnorth power station. In September 1963, it was awarded a £3.7 million contract for the Belfast south approach road, which was seven miles of motorway. In July 1964 they were awarded the £4.3 million contract for the Coldra-Crick section of the London – South Wales motorway (M4), which was nine miles of motorway with an 830 ft viaduct at Coldra and a 720 ft viaduct of the Nedern Valley. It had also been awarded the £5.5 million contract for the seven-mile Newport By-Pass Road (M4), both sections of the M4 opened in March 1967; the Brynglas Tunnels were built by Sir Robert McAlpine. It was awarded a £300,000 contract to connect the M5 with the M6 on an elevated section, with most bridge structure made by Dorman Long of Middlesbrough. It built the main printing works for the Nigerian Security Printing and Minting Company Limited on Victoria Island in Lagos. In July 1965, it was given the £7 million contract for a seven-mile motorway between Lurgan and Birches in Armagh.
It opened its new headquarters, in December 1965, in Putney. In March 1966, it opened the £3.3 million motorway (M1) section from Sprucefield to Moira, and had been awarded the £7.5 million contract to extend it to Craigavon. In 1968, it was awarded the £6.75 million contract for the South of Quinton to Great Barr Section of the Midland Links Motorway (M5). In November 1968 it was awarded the £12.4 million contract for a thirteen-mile section of the M62. In January 1970, it was awarded the £9.2 million contract for the M4 section between Wickham and Theale. In June 1972, it was awarded a £5 million contract for the Ellesmere Port motorway. In February 1973 it was awarded the £4.5 million contract for the Bury easterly bypass southern section.

The Company produced two books, which are predominantly lists and pictures of contracts; This way Forward, cited below, and Sir Lindsay Parkinson and Company (undated early 1970s?).

Takeover
In 1973, due to strikes, it suffered an £858,000 loss. In August 1974 it was taken over by Leonard Fairclough & Son, based at Sandiway House in Northwich. In 1982, this company merged with William Press Group to form AMEC.

Housing
For housing estates and maisonettes, it used the Parkwall System of construction. For tower blocks from 8 to 20 storeys it used the Bison Wall Frame System.

Projects

Structures
 Aldwych House
 Tema Harbour
 No.3 Fish Dock, Grimsby
 Maternity Unit at Bradford Royal Infirmary
 Basildon Hospital
 RAF Coningsby - runway extension and aircraft servicing platform
 Beckton Gas Terminal - soil cement roadways and preliminary works
 Lautoka Hospital, Fiji Islands

Roads
 M6 Lancaster bypass (12 miles)
 M6 junctions 8 to 10
 M62, A56 to A672 (Windy Hill)
 Ellesmere Port motorway M53, in 1972
 M4 Coldra to Crick (23 to 24)
 M4 Newport By-Pass (25 to 28)
 M4 junctions 12 to 14
 M1 (N Ireland) junctions 8 to 9
 M1 (N Ireland) junctions 10 to 12
 A470 Llanelltyd By Pass, near Dolgellau

Reservoirs
 Fleetwood Reservoir
 Boothwood Reservoir
 Llys-y-Fran Dam

References

Sources

Construction and civil engineering companies of the United Kingdom
Companies formerly listed on the London Stock Exchange
Companies based in Blackpool
Construction and civil engineering companies established in 1937
British companies established in 1937
London Borough of Wandsworth
1937 establishments in England
1974 disestablishments in England
1974 mergers and acquisitions
British companies disestablished in 1974
Construction and civil engineering companies disestablished in the 20th century